Manili may refers to:
 Corrado Manili (died 1522), Italian Roman Catholic bishop
 Liza Manili (born 1986), French actress
 Manili massacre, the mass murder of 70 Moro Muslims in North Cotabato, Philippines